Novigrad na Dobri is a village in Karlovac County, Croatia. The name translates in English to "New town on the Dobra river".

Across the river Dobra, there is a 14th-century castle that once belonged to the Croatian noble family Frankopan.

References

Populated places in Karlovac County